Tourek Williams (born May 9, 1991) is a former American football outside linebacker. He was drafted by the San Diego Chargers in the sixth round of the 2013 NFL Draft. He played college football at Florida International.

High school
Williams attended Miami Norland Senior High School in Miami Gardens, Florida. After a great senior season, he was named an All-Dade County selection and District 12-6A first-team selection.

He was considered a two-star recruit by Rivals.com.

College career
Williams attended Florida International University from 2009 to 2012. During his tenure, he collected 150 total tackles, including 45 for loss, 18 sacks, seven pass deflections, and two forced fumbles. He also record 18.0 sacks, which is second in school history. He earned All-Sun Belt honors three times during his career.

Professional career

San Diego Chargers
Williams was drafted by the San Diego Chargers in the sixth round (179th overall) of the 2013 NFL Draft.

Williams played mostly special teams, but was forced into the starting lineup due to the injuries of Jarrett Johnson and Melvin Ingram. He played 13 games, starting 6, collecting 10 tackles, 1 sack, and a forced fumble.

Kansas City Chiefs
On May 22, 2017, Williams signed with the Kansas City Chiefs. He was waived on May 30, 2017.

References

External links
 FlU Panthers bio
 Los Angeles Chargers bio

1991 births
Living people
Players of American football from Miami
Players of American football from Tallahassee, Florida
American football linebackers
American football defensive ends
FIU Panthers football players
San Diego Chargers players
Kansas City Chiefs players
Miami Norland Senior High School alumni